The Futsal at the Asian Indoor and Martial Arts Games is a futsal competition of the Asian Indoor and Martial Arts Games. It was first held in 2005.

Results

Men

Women

Medal table

Participating nations
Legend
QF — Quarterfinals
R1 — Round 1

Men

Women

See also
FIFA Futsal World Cup
AMF Futsal World Cup
AMF Futsal Women's World Cup
AFC Futsal Asian Cup
AFC U-20 Futsal Asian Cup
AFC Women's Futsal Asian Cup
Asian Games
FIFA
Asian Football Confederation

References
2005 Asian Indoor Games Futsal Tournament, FutsalPlanet.com
2007 Asian Indoor Games Futsal Tournament, FutsalPlanet.com
2009 Asian Indoor Games Futsal Tournament, FutsalPlanet.com
2013 Asian Indoor and Martial Arts Games Futsal Tournament, FutsalPlanet.com

 
Asian
Asian Indoor Games
Indoor Games